The 1978 Skate Canada International was held at the Pacific Coloseum in Vancouver, British Columbia on October 26–29. Medals were awarded in the disciplines of men's singles, ladies' singles, and ice dancing.

Results

Men
The men's free skating took place on Saturday, October 28.

Ladies

Ice dancing

References

Skate Canada International, 1978
Skate Canada International
Skate Canada International 
Skate Canada International
Skate Canada International